In aviation, the first officer (FO), also called co-pilot, is a pilot in addition to the captain, who is the legal commander. In the event of incapacitation of the captain, the first officer will assume command of the aircraft.

Control of the aircraft is normally shared equally between the first officer and the captain, with one pilot normally designated the "pilot flying" and the other the "pilot not flying", or "pilot monitoring", for each flight. Even when the first officer is the flying pilot, however, the captain remains ultimately responsible for the aircraft, its passengers, and the crew. In typical day-to-day operations, the essential job tasks remain fairly equal. Often the first officer will log time as pilot in command under supervision (PICUS), for the purpose of working towards an airline transport pilot licence. 

Traditionally, the first officer sits on the right-hand side of a fixed-wing aircraft ("right seat") and the left-hand side of a helicopter (the reason for this difference is related to, in many cases, the pilot flying being unable to release the right hand from the cyclic control to operate the instruments, thus they sit on the right side and do that with the left hand).

On a long haul flight, there may be multiple captains and first officers on board, to act as relief crew. While the captain rests, the senior of first officers sits in the left-hand seat, as for example on Air France Flight 447.

Many airlines promote by seniority only within their own company. As a consequence, an airline first officer may be older and/or have more flight experience than a captain, by virtue of having experience from other airlines or the military.

Some airlines have the rank of "junior first officer", for pilots who are not yet fully qualified. 
Modern airliners require two pilots. When a junior first officer is undergoing training, a safety pilot will sit in the jump seat to monitor the junior first officer and the captain. A junior first officer is sometimes known as a second officer.

After a certain number of flight hours and experience, a first officer can be promoted to senior first officer. A senior first officer will typically have at least 1,500 hours flight experience. Some pilots prefer to remain a senior first officer than pursue an upgrade to captain.

See also 
 Aircrew
 Chief mate
 Second officer (aviation)
 Third officer (aviation)

References

Bibliography
 Harris, Tom.  How Airline Crews Work,  HowStuffWorks.com website, June 14, 2001. Retrieved September 2, 2014.
 Smith, Patrick. Patrick Smith's Ask The Pilot: When a Pilot Dies in Flight,  AskThePilot.com website, 2013, which in turn cites:
Smith, Patrick. Cockpit Confidential: Everything You Need to Know About Air Travel: Questions, Answers, and Reflections, Sourcebooks, 2013, .
 Flying the World in Clipper Ships at flightjournal.com, 2007.

Titles
Occupations in aviation